Osvaldo Guerrero-Camargo (born 20 January 1974) is a Mexican former professional boxer who competed from 1991 to 2004, challenging for the IBF mini flyweight title in 1995.

Pro career
Guerrero went pro in March 1991, he had fought a total of 21 times, only losing once to Rafael Orozco, a fellow-countryman by knockout in 1992. In 1995, he traveled to Thailand to challenge IBF Mini flyweight world title with Thai holder Ratanapol Sor Vorapin, Sor Vorapin's 12th title defense. Prior in 1994, he was WBC Strawweight international champion, by won with TKO Manny Melchor a former IBF Mini flyweight world champion from the Philippines, in the seventh round.

Long-haired Guerrero, who always nerves Sor Vorapin, gave an interview that he will defeat Sor Vorapin by knockout in the second round, and will take IBF title to unify with WBC same weight class of title holder Ricardo "El Finito" López, a fellow Mexican.

The event was held at a Chakkam Khanathon School in northern Thailand on December 30 of the same year. The bout turned out to be that he was the only receiving Sor Vorapin's punches, with only a few counterattacks especially in the fifth round. Finally, at the beginning of the sixth round, his mentor asked to surrender. After the fight, Sor Vorapin showed his sportsmanship by raising Guerrero's left hand around the ring to acknowledge his fighting spirit.

After that, he continued boxing and had four chances to challenge the regional and international titles, one of which was against former WBC Light flyweight world champion Melchor Cob Castro, but he lost all of them. 

He lost 17 consecutive fights from 2000 until his retirement in 2004. Guerrero record for 50 fights is 27 wins (24 on knockouts), 23 losses (13 on knockouts); his overall knockout percentage was 48%.

References

External links

1974 births
Living people
Boxers from Guerrero
Light-flyweight boxers
Mini-flyweight boxers 
Mexican male boxers
Bantamweight boxers
Super-bantamweight boxers